San Clemente Pier station is a passenger train station near the San Clemente Pier in San Clemente, California, United States. The station is lightly used – only four Amtrak Pacific Surfliner trains per day stop at the station (two trains in each direction), while Metrolink's Orange County Line and Inland Empire–Orange County Line only serve the station on Saturdays and Sundays (Metrolink also serves San Clemente station just north of this station daily). 

San Clemente Pier boarded or detrained a total of 15,017 Amtrak passengers in the 2013 fiscal year, an average of approximately 41 passengers daily, an over 50% increase from the 2012 fiscal year. Of the 74 California stations served by Amtrak, San Clemente Pier was the 54th-busiest in the 2013 fiscal year. In 2020, the ridership at the station dropped 57.4% to a total of 6,707, largely due to complications of the COVID-19 pandemic.

The station was formerly a stop of the Santa Fe's San Diegan line.

References

External links

San Clemente Pier Amtrak-Metrolink Station (USA RailGuide -- TrainWeb)

Amtrak stations in Orange County, California
Metrolink stations in Orange County, California
Geography in San Clemente, California